Freoexocentrus mirei is a species of beetle in the family Cerambycidae, and the only species in the genus Freoexocentrus. It was described by Breuning in 1977.

References

Acanthocinini
Beetles described in 1977
Taxa named by Stephan von Breuning (entomologist)